Almont Community Schools is a school district located in Almont, Michigan, United States.  It has three schools, each covering the whole district for the specific grades they serve.

Schools
 Almont High School
 Almont Middle School
 Orchard Primary School

 Former school
 Almont Elementary School

References

Sources
Almont Community Schools
School district web site

Education in Lapeer County, Michigan
School districts in Michigan